Laranjeiras is a neighborhood in Rio de Janeiro, Brazil

Laranjeiras (Portuguese for orange trees) may also refer to:

Brazil

Places
 Laranjeiras, Sergipe
 Laranjeiras do Sul, Paraná
 Divino das Laranjeiras, Minas Gerais
 Nova Laranjeiras, Paraná
 Sebastião Laranjeiras, Bahia 
 Laranjeiras River (Paraná)
 Laranjeiras River (Santa Catarina)
 Palácio Laranjeiras, the official residence of the governor of Rio de Janeiro state

Football
 Estádio das Laranjeiras, a football stadium in Laranjeiras, Rio de Janeiro
 Laranjeiras Esporte Clube, a football club in Laranjeiras, Sergipe

Other uses
 Laranjeiras (Lisbon Metro), a railway station in Lisbon, Portugal

See also
 Laranjeira, a surname